André Randall (9 December 1892 – 4 July 1974) was a French screen actor. He was born André Ayaïs in Bordeaux and died at Sainte-Foy-la-Grande.

Filmography 
1919: The Odds Against Her (directed by Alexander Butler)
1931: Mistigri (directed by Harry Lachmann)
1935: L'Heureuse Aventure (directed by Jean Georgescu) - Joe Wilkins - le pasteur
1943: The Butler's Dilemma (directed by Leslie S. Hiscott) - Vitello
1944: English Without Tears (directed by Harold French) - Dutch Officer
1945: The Man from Morocco (directed by Mutz Greenbaum) - French General
1948: Mademoiselle Has Fun (directed by Jean Boyer) - William Gibson
1948: The Lame Devil (directed by Sacha Guitry) - Lord Grey
1951: Monsieur Fabre (directed by Henri Diamant-Berger) - Le philosophe John Stuart Mill
1951: Atoll K (directed by Léo Joannon) - Branwell
1957: Les Lavandières du Portugal (directed by Pierre Gaspard-Huit) - Antoine Molinié
1960: Austerlitz (directed by Abel Gance) - Whitworth
1961: Aimez-vous Brahms ? (directed by Anatole Litvak) - Mr. Steiner (final film role)

External links 
 André Randall on lesgensducinema
 

French male film actors
1892 births
Male actors from Bordeaux
1974 deaths